Larry's River is a small Acadian community in the Canadian province of Nova Scotia, located in the Municipality of the District of Guysborough in Guysborough County. The community is named after one of its settlers, Larry Keating. Settlers arrived from Chezzetcook soon after the expulsion ended in 1763.

Parks
Tor Bay Provincial Park

References
Larry's River on Destination Nova Scotia
The Society of Tor Bay Acadians

Communities in Guysborough County, Nova Scotia
General Service Areas in Nova Scotia